Quinisulcius is a genus of nematodes belonging to the family Belonolaimidae.

The genus has almost cosmopolitan distribution.

Species:

Quinisulcius acutoides 
Quinisulcius acutus 
Quinisulcius brevistyletus 
Quinisulcius cacti 
Quinisulcius capitatus 
Quinisulcius curvus 
Quinisulcius curvus 
Quinisulcius dalatensis 
Quinisulcius domesticus 
Quinisulcius gumdariensis 
Quinisulcius indicus 
Quinisulcius lineatus 
Quinisulcius obregonus 
Quinisulcius punici 
Quinisulcius quaidi 
Quinisulcius rotundicephalus 
Quinisulcius seshadrii 
Quinisulcius tarjani

References

Tylenchida
Nematode genera